22 Vulpeculae is a binary star system in the northern constellation Vulpecula. Based on its parallax, it is located some 1,490 light-years away, and it has an apparent magnitude of about 5.2, making it visible to the naked eye. The system is moving closer to the Earth with a heliocentric radial velocity of −23 km/s.

The primary component is a G-type bright giant. It is over four times as massive as the Sun, and over 96 times as wide. Its companion is a B-type main-sequence star, 3.4 times as massive as the Sun. The primary star is rotating slowly with a rotation period that appears to be between about 140 and 165 days, unexpectedly faster than the orbital period. Different parts of its atmosphere may be rotating at different speeds.

The two stars have an orbit that is oriented in such a way that they periodically eclipse each other, each star alternately blocking the light of the other. For that, it has been given the variable star designation QS Vulpeculae; 22 Vulpeculae is the Flamsteed designation.  The maximum drop in visual apparent magnitude is 0.05 magnitudes when the hot secondary is completely hidden by the large cool primary.  The eclipses are deeper at shorter wavelengths because a greater proportion of the short-wavelength radiation comes from the hot star.  The primary eclipses last for eight days at visual wavelengths, but partial phases can be detected for up to 17 days at ultraviolet wavelengths due to the expanded atmosphere and wind of the primary star.  Secondary eclipse, where the hot star transits the cooler one, are undetectable, and ellipsoidal variations due to distortion of the large primary produce brightness changes of less than 1.5%.

References

G-type bright giants
B-type main-sequence stars
Algol variables
Vulpecula
Durchmusterung objects
Vulpeculae, 22
192713
099853
7741
Vulpeculae, QS